OJSC Nizhniy Tagil Iron and Steel Works (Niznhetagilsky Metallurgichecky Kombinat) is a Russian steel manufacturer.  It is part of the Evraz Group.  Its name is abbreviated as NTMK or Nikom and NTMK is listed in RTS Index.

History

The company is located in the Ural Mountains, in the city of Nizhniy Tagil, in Sverdlovsk Oblast.  The city has been a steel-making center for centuries, and the company's website boasts a long historical association with the industry.  Large-scale steel manufacture began in 1725, at the end of the reign of Peter the Great.  At this time in the town's history, half of the output was exported to England.

In 1992 NTMK underwent privatization and was organized into a joint-stock company.

Operational details

The city is convenient to the Yekaterinburg - Perm railway and through the Kama River to the Volga River.

The orestock in the Nizhniy Tagil region is vanadium-rich.  The company has pioneered the blast oxygen process of steelmaking and according to its website, it has the world's largest H-beam manufacturing facility.

NTMK specializes in manufacturing rolling stock, train wheels and train rails.

External links
Nizhniy Tagil Iron and Steel Works
Evraz Group
Nizhniy Tagil Steel Fabricating Plant, photograph of a bird's-eye perspective drawing, Albert Kahn Associates, 1930s, Canadian Centre for Architecture

Evraz
Steel companies of the Russian Soviet Federative Socialist Republic
Companies based in Sverdlovsk Oblast
Companies formerly listed on the Moscow Exchange
Nizhny Tagil
Cultural heritage monuments of regional significance in Sverdlovsk Oblast